Handle with Care is a 1935 British comedy film directed by Randall Faye and starring Molly Lamont, Jack Hobbs and James Finlayson. It was a quota quickie made at the Nettlefold Studios in Walton-on-Thames.

Cast
 Molly Lamont as Patricia  
 Jack Hobbs as Jack  
 James Finlayson as Jimmy  
 Henry Victor as Count Paul  
 Vera Bogetti as Fifi  
 Margaret Yarde as Mrs. Tunbody  
 Toni Edgar-Bruce as Lady Deeping  
 Stafford Hilliard as Prof. Deeping

References

Bibliography
 Low, Rachael. Filmmaking in 1930s Britain. George Allen & Unwin, 1985.
 Wood, Linda. British Films, 1927-1939. British Film Institute, 1986.

External links

1935 films
British comedy films
1935 comedy films
Films shot at Nettlefold Studios
Films directed by Randall Faye
Quota quickies
British black-and-white films
1930s English-language films
1930s British films
English-language comedy films